The banded cat-eyed snake (Leptodeira annulata) is a species of mildly venomous, rear-fanged, colubrid snake, endemic to the New World.

Common names
Additional common names include: cat-eyed night snake, come sapo, culebra de pantano, culebra destenida, machete savane, mapana de agua, mapana tigre, and ranera.

Geographic range
It is found in Mexico, Central America, and  South America, including the offshore islands of Margarita, and Trinidad and Tobago.

Description
Adults are about 750 mm (30 in) long and very slender.  The head is distinct from the neck, and the large eyes have vertically elliptic pupils. The back is yellowish or brown with a series of dark brown or blackish spots often confluent into an undulous or zigzag stripe.

Venom
It has a pair of enlarged, grooved teeth at the rear of each upper jaw (maxilla), and produces a mild venom.. The venom affects the snake's natural prey (mainly small frogs and small lizards). The snake tends not to bite humans when handled, but when it does, the venom has relatively mild effects in most individuals (some describe it as a slight irritating/itching sensation with slight swelling). The snake is not considered a risk to human health.

Habitat
It inhabits moist areas. The snake tends to be found in forest (moist and dry forest) as well as in areas near forest edge (including well vegetated urbanized areas near forest edge). They are often associated with riparian zones, as well as the margins of swamps and marshes.

Behavior
Leptodeira annulata is nocturnal, and it hunts and feeds in trees and on the ground.

Diet
It preys on frogs, frog eggs, tadpoles, salamanders, and small reptiles such as lizards (including anoles) and smaller snakes, as well as fish. It may also feed on fledgling birds.

Reproduction
Snakes of the genus Leptodeira are oviparous, sometimes exhibiting delayed fertilization.

References

Further reading

Halowell, E. 1845. Description of Reptiles, from South America, supposed to be new. Proc. Acad. Nat. Sci. Philadelphia 2: 241–247. ("Coluber Ashmeadii", pp. 244–245.)
Linnaeus, C. 1758. Systema naturæ per regna tria naturæ, secundum classes, ordines, genera, species, cum characteribus, differentiis, synonymis, locis. Tomus I. Editio Decima, Reformata. L. Salvius. Stockholm. 824 pp. (Coluber annulatus, p. 224.)
Morris, Percy A. 1948. Boy's Book of Snakes: How to Recognize and Understand Them. A volume of the Humanizing Science Series, edited by Jaques Cattell. Ronald Press. New York. 185 pp. ("Night Snake", Leptodira annulata, pp. 140–141, 181.)

Leptodeira
Reptiles of Trinidad and Tobago
Snakes of South America
Reptiles described in 1758
Taxa named by Carl Linnaeus